Parakneria spekii is a species of fish in the family Kneriidae. It is endemic to Tanzania.  Its natural habitat is rivers.

References

spekii
Endemic fauna of Tanzania
Freshwater fish of Tanzania
Taxonomy articles created by Polbot
Fish described in 1868
Taxa named by Albert Günther